MassKara Queen 2015 was the 35th edition of the MassKara Festival Queen pageant was held on October 12, 2015 at SMX Convention Center in SM City Bacolod in Bacolod City, Philippines. Sam Gergiana Yu, a Bachelor of Secondary Education major in Mathematics major, was crowned by the outgoing winner Christine Joy Madamba at the end of the event.

Final Results

Special awards

See also
MassKara Festival Queen
MassKara Festival

References

Beauty pageants in the Philippines